Penthophonus is a genus of beetles in the family Carabidae, containing the following species:

 Penthophonus astutus Tschitscherine, 1903
 Penthophonus glasunovi (Tschitscherine, 1898)
 Penthophonus peyroni (Brulerie, 1873)
 Penthophonus solitarius (Peyron, 1858)
 Penthophonus taygetanus Pic, 1911

References

Harpalinae